Kelley House may refer to:

in the United States
(by state then city)
James Kelley House (Tennille, Georgia), listed on the National Register of Historic Places (NRHP) in Washington County
Marion and Julia Kelley House, Hazelton, Idaho, listed on the NRHP in Jerome County
Kelley-Fredrickson House and Office Building, South Bend, Indiana, listed on the NRHP in St. Joseph County
Kelley House (Dubuque, Iowa), listed on the NRHP in Dubuque County
John S. Kelley House, Bardstown, Kentucky, listed on the NRHP in Nelson County 
James Kelley House (Bowling Green, Kentucky), listed on the NRHP in Warren County
Mercelia Evelyn Eldridge Kelley House, Chatham, Massachusetts, listed on the NRHP in Barnstable County
Oliver H. Kelley Homestead, Elk River, Minnesota, listed on the NRHP in Sherburne County
Kelley-Reppert Motor Company Building, Kansas City, Missouri, listed on the NRHP in Jackson County
Barney Kelley House, Washington Courthouse, Ohio, listed on the NRHP in Fayette County
Jacob Kelley House, Hartsville, South Carolina, listed on the NRHP in Darlington County 
Kelley House (Chattanooga, Tennessee), listed on the NRHP in Hamilton County
Mancel Kelley House, Dayton, Washington, listed on the NRHP in Columbia County

See also
Kelly House (disambiguation)
James Kelley House (disambiguation)